Alfred Kucharczyk (2 November 1937 – 2 December 2020) was a Polish gymnast. He competed at the 1960 Summer Olympics and the 1964 Summer Olympics.

Kucharczyk died from COVID-19 on 2 December 2020, amid the pandemic in Poland.

References

External links
 

1937 births
2020 deaths
Polish male artistic gymnasts
Olympic gymnasts of Poland
Gymnasts at the 1960 Summer Olympics
Gymnasts at the 1964 Summer Olympics
People from Wodzisław County
Deaths from the COVID-19 pandemic in Poland